Moody Coliseum is a 3,600-seat multi-purpose arena in Abilene.  It is home to the Abilene Christian Wildcats men's and women's basketball, and volleyball teams. It is also used for concerts, chapel services, graduations and other special events, with a maximum capacity of 3,600. 

The arena recently reopened after undergoing extensive renovations. New features include: 
Additional leg room in the main seating in the coliseum.
Larger seats in some sections.
Improved accessibility.
A 2,000-square-foot club room.
Practice gymnasium.
An academic center and main level. hospitality suite.
Additional offices for athletics administration.
Upgraded locker rooms and training rooms. 
Upgraded restrooms and concessions.
Upgraded audio/visual system, including 21 LED boards.

See also
 List of NCAA Division I basketball arenas

References

College basketball venues in the United States
Abilene Christian Wildcats men's basketball
Abilene Christian Wildcats women's basketball
Basketball venues in Texas
Indoor arenas in Texas
Sports venues in Abilene, Texas
Volleyball venues in Texas
Western Athletic Conference volleyball
1968 establishments in Texas
Sports venues completed in 1968